Olympic Dam Highway is a sealed,  long, outback highway in South Australia that runs from Stuart Highway in Pimba to Olympic Dam via Woomera. The road also provides access to the town of Roxby Downs. It is designated route B97.

Route
Olympic Dam Highway commences at the intersection with Stuart Highway at Pimba and heads north, crossing the Trans-Australia railway line shortly afterwards, passing Woomera not long after, and continues in a northerly direction through arid zones for some distance before the old alignment of the highway, now named Olympic Way, branches northwest to Roxby Downs, meeting with it again some kilometres to the north as it bypasses the town to the east. It continues north until eventually reaching the Olympic Dam Village a short distance later, and eventually ending at the intersection with Borefield Road, just before the security checkpoint at the entrance to the Olympic Dam mine site.

History
Olympic Dam Highway had no previous route marker until South Australia's conversion to their newer alphanumeric system in 1998, when it was allocated route B97.

In January 2022, Olympic Dam Highway was cut due to a section of the road being washed out. The same section of road was also washed out in October 2022.

Major intersections

References

Highways in South Australia